Unstrut-Hainich is a municipality in the district Unstrut-Hainich-Kreis, in Thuringia, Germany. It was created with effect from 1 January 2019 by the merger of the former municipalities of Altengottern, Flarchheim, Großengottern, Heroldishausen, Mülverstedt and Weberstedt. The name refers to the river Unstrut and the hill chain Hainich.

References

Unstrut-Hainich-Kreis